Boris Deugoué N'Gagoué (born 2 November 1985) is a French football defender.

Career 
Deugoué began his career at the age of 10 at Paris F.C., before moving to FC Gueugnon. 
He has subsequently worn the colors of Olympiakos Nicosia in the  Cypriot First Division and then in 2008 he signed for CDA Navalcarnero in the Spanish Tercera División Group 7. He is a central defender who may also evolve into a defensive midfielder. 
In the summer of 2009, he signed for a period of 2 years with Servette F.C. He left the club before the 2010–11 season.

References

External links
 

Living people
1985 births
French footballers
Association football midfielders
FC Gueugnon players
Olympiakos Nicosia players
Servette FC players
FC Montana players
First Professional Football League (Bulgaria) players
Expatriate footballers in Cyprus
Expatriate footballers in Spain
Expatriate footballers in Switzerland
Expatriate footballers in Bulgaria
Footballers from Yaoundé
French sportspeople of Cameroonian descent
Association football defenders